Teresita is a genus of moths in the family Oecophoridae described by John Frederick Gates Clarke in 1978.

Species
Teresita diffinis (Felder & Rogenhofer, 1875)
Teresita isaura Clarke, 1978

References

External links
 - original description of genus

Oecophorinae
Moth genera